Mecodema genesispotini is a species of ground beetle found in a small native forest remnant, between paddocks and pine forest, in the Waimata Valley, northwest of Gisborne, New Zealand.

Naming
The specific epithet is in honour of Genesis Potini.

Diagnosis 
It is distinguished from other North Island Mecodema species by having the vertexal groove (head) defined by rugose wrinkles and punctures along the entire groove; 8-10 setae along each side of the pronotum carina; the base of the pronotum has numerous light punctures between the pronotal foveae; plus, the distinctive shape of the apical portion of the penis lobe.

Description 
It has a length of 26.6–32 mm, pronotal width of 7.3–9.1 mm, and elytral width of 8.4–10.3 mm. Colour of head and pronotum matte to glossy black, abdomen and elytra matte dark reddish-brown to black; coxae and legs dark reddish-brown.

Natural history 
Further research is required.

References 

genesispotini
Beetles described in 2019